Johanna Katriina Ojala-Niemelä (born 1 October 1974 in Muonio) is a Finnish politician currently serving in the Parliament of Finland for the Social Democratic Party of Finland at the Lapland constituency.

References

1974 births
Living people
People from Muonio
Social Democratic Party of Finland politicians
Members of the Parliament of Finland (2007–11)
Members of the Parliament of Finland (2011–15)
Members of the Parliament of Finland (2015–19)
Members of the Parliament of Finland (2019–23)
21st-century Finnish women politicians
Women members of the Parliament of Finland